The year 1935 was marked, in science fiction, by the following events.

Births and deaths

Births 
 January 15 : Robert Silverberg, American writer.
 June 25 : Charles Sheffield, British writer (died 2002)

Deaths 
 December 14 : Stanley Weinbaum, American writer (born 1902)

Events

Literary releases

Novels 
 It Can't Happen Here, by Sinclair Lewis.
 Quinzinzinzili, by Régis Messac.

Stories collections

Short stories

Comics

Audiovisual outputs

Movies 
 Bride of Frankenstein, by James Whale.
 Loss of Sensation, by Alexandr Andriyevsky.

Awards 
The main science-fiction Awards known at the present time did not exist at this time.

See also 
 1935 in science
 1934 in science fiction
 1936 in science fiction

References

Science fiction by year

science-fiction